Balcones Canyonlands  is a national wildlife refuge located in the Texas Hill Country to the northwest of Lago Vista, Texas.  The refuge was formed in 1992 to conserve habitat for two endangered songbirds, the golden-cheeked warbler and the black-capped vireo, and to preserve Texas Hill Country habitat for numerous other wildlife species. The refuge augments a similarly named preserve in Austin called the Balcones Canyonlands Preserve.

The refuge is located within a deeply dissected portion of the Edwards Plateau that contains many steep-banked streams and canyons.  The canyons facing Austin are deeply etched into the limestone of the Edwards Plateau by tributaries of the Colorado River.

Beneath the surface of the Edwards Plateau lies an underground labyrinth of caves, sinkholes, and springs. Various spiders, beetles, and other creatures inhabit this below-ground world, and are unique to this area of Texas.  Even deeper below the surface lies the Edwards Aquifer, which stores billions of gallons of water and supplies drinking water for almost one million people.  The aquifer is also the source of many springs that feed Hill Country rivers, which eventually flow into the marshes, estuaries, and bays along the Texas Gulf Coast.

The vegetation found in the Hill Country includes various oaks, elms, and Ashe juniper trees (often referred to as "cedars" in Texas). The endangered golden-cheeked warbler and black-capped vireo depend on different successional stages of this vegetation.  Both of these birds nest in the Edwards Plateau, the warbler exclusively.

Gallery

See also
Balcones Fault
Barton Creek
Colorado Bend State Park
Colorado River (Texas)
Llano Uplift
Mount Bonnell
Pedernales River
Texas Hill Country

References

External links
USFWS.gov: Official Balcones Canyonlands National Wildlife Refuge website
USFWS.gov: Profile of Balcones Canyonlands National Wildlife Refuge

National Wildlife Refuges in Texas
Texas Hill Country
Wetlands of Texas
Protected areas of Burnet County, Texas
Protected areas of Travis County, Texas
Protected areas of Williamson County, Texas
Landforms of Burnet County, Texas
Landforms of Travis County, Texas
Landforms of Williamson County, Texas
Protected areas established in 1992
1992 establishments in Texas